A Z-source inverter is a type of power inverter, a circuit that converts direct current to alternating current. It functions as a buck-boost inverter without making use of DC-DC converter bridge due to its unique circuit topology.

Impedance (Z-) Source networks provide an efficient means of power conversion between source and load in a wide range of electric power conversion applications (dc–dc, dc–ac, ac–dc, ac– ac) [3], [4]. Z-source-related research has grown rapidly since it was first proposed in 2002 by Prof. F. Z. Peng. A comprehensive pulse width modulation scheme for Z-source inverters was proposed by Prof. P. C. Loh and Prof. D. M. Vilathgamuwa [10]. The numbers of modifications and new Z-source topologies have grown exponentially. Improvements to the impedance networks by introducing coupled magnetics have also been lately proposed for achieving even higher voltage boosting, while using a shorter shoot-through time [6]. They include the Γ-source, T-source, trans-Zsource, TZ-source, LCCT-Z-source (proposed in 2011 by Dr Marek Adamowicz and utilizing high frequency transformer connected in series with two dc-current-blocking capacitors) [16], high-frequency transformer-isolated, and Y-source [5] networks. Amongst them, the Y-source network (proposed in year 2013 by Dr Yam P. Siwakoti) is more versatile and can in fact be viewed as the generic network, from which the Γ-source, T-source, and trans-Z-source networks are derived [6]. The incommensurate properties of this network open a new horizon to researchers and engineers to explore, expand, and modify the circuit for a wide range of power conversion applications.

Types of inverters 

Inverters can be classified by their structure:

1. Single-phase inverter:

This type of inverter consists of two legs or two poles. (A pole is connection of two switches where source of one and drain of other are connected and this common point is taken out).

2. Three-phase inverter:

This type of inverter consists of three legs or poles or four legs (three legs for phases and one for neutral).

But, inverters are also classified based on the type of input source. And they are,

1. Voltage-source inverter (VSI)

In this type of inverter, a constant voltage source acts as input to the inverter bridge. The constant voltage source is obtained by connecting a large capacitor across the DC source.

2. Current-source inverter (CSI)

In this type of inverter, a constant current source acts as input to the inverter bridge. The constant current source is obtained by connecting a large inductor in series the DC source.

Disadvantages 

Typical inverters (VSI and CSI) have few disadvantages. They are listed as,

 Behave in a boost or buck operation only. Thus the obtainable output voltage range is limited, either smaller or greater than the input voltage.
 Vulnerable to EMI noise and the devices gets damaged in either open or short circuit conditions.
 The combined system of DC-DC boost converter and the inverter has lower reliability.
 The main switching device of VSI and CSI are not interchangeable.

Advantages of ZSI 

The advantages of Z-source inverter are listed as follows,

 The source can be either a voltage source or a current source. The DC source of a ZSI can either be a battery, a diode rectifier or a thyristor converter, a fuel cell stack or a combination of these.
 The main circuit of a ZSI can either be the traditional VSI or the traditional CSI.
 Works as a buck-boost inverter.
 The load of a ZSC can either be inductive or capacitive or another Z-Source ntwrk.

Applications 

 Renewable energy sources
 Electric vehicles
 Motor drives

References 

[1]. 'Power Electronics' by M Rashid.

[2]. Fang Z. Peng, “Z-source inverter”, in IEEE Transactions on Industry Applications, vol. 39, no. 2, March/April 2003, pp. 504–510.

[3]. Yam P. Siwakoti, F. Z. Peng, F. Blaabjerg, P. C. Loh and G. E. Town, “Impedance Source Network for Electric Power Conversion — Part I: A Topological Review” IEEE Trans. on Power Electron., vol. 30, no. 2, pp. 699–716, Feb. 2015.

[4]. Yam P. Siwakoti, F. Z. Peng, F. Blaabjerg, P. C. Loh, G. E. Town and S. Yang, “Impedance Source Network for Electric Power Conversion — Part II: Review of Control and Modulation Techniques” IEEE Trans. on Power Electron., vol. 30, no. 4, pp. 1887–1905, Apr. 2015.

[5]. Yam P. Siwakoti, P. C. Loh, F. Blaabjerg and G. E. Town, “Y-source Impedance Network,” IEEE Trans. Power Electron. (Letter), vol. 29, no. 7, pp. 3250–3254, Jul. 2014.

[6]. Yam P. Siwakoti, F. Blaabjerg and P. C. Loh, “New Magnetically Coupled Impedance (Z-) Source Networks,” IEEE Trans. Power Electron., DOI: 10.1109/TPEL.2015.2459233, June 2015.

[7]. A. Florescu, O. Stocklosa, M. Teodorescu, C. Radoi, D.A. Stoichescu and S. Rosu, “The Advantages, Limitations and Disadvantages of Z-source inverter”, in IEEE Semiconductor Conference (CAS), vol. 2, 13 Oct. 2010, pp. 483–486.

[8]. Miaosen Shen, Alan Joseph, Jin Wang, Fang Z. Peng and Donald J. Adams, “Comparison of Traditional inverters and Z-source inverter”, in IEEE Power Electronics Specialists Conference (PESC), no. 36, 16 June 2005, pp. 1692–1698.

[9]. Miaosen Shen and Fang Z. Peng, “Operation Modes and Characteristics of the Z-source inverter with Small Inductance”, in IEEE Conference on Industry Applications, 2005, no. 2, 2-6 Oct. 2005, pp. 1253–1260.

[10] Poh Chiang Loh, D. Mahinda Vilathgamuwa, Yue Sen Lai Geok Tin Chua and Yunwei Li, “Pulse-Width Modulation of Z-source inverters”, in IEEE Conference on Industry Applications, vol. 1, no. 39, 3-7 Oct. 2004, pp. 148–155.

[11]. Shajith Ali, U. and Kamaraj, V., "A novel space vector PWM for Z-source inverter",  in IEEE International Conference on Electrical Energy Systems (ICEES), 2011, pp. 82–85.

[12]. Jingbo Liu, Jiangang Hu and Longya Xu, “Dynamic Modeling and Analysis of Z Source Converter- Derivation of AC Small Signal Model and Design-Oriented Analysis” in IEEE Transactions on Power Electronics, vol. 22, no. 5, Sept 2007, pp. 1786–1796.

[13]. Meera Murali, N. Gopalakrishnan, V.N. Pande, “Z-Sourced Unified Power Flow Controller”, in 6th IET International Conference on Power Electronics, Machines and Drives, 2012, pp. 1–7.

[14]. Xinping Ding, Zhaoming Qian, Shuitao Yang, Bin Cui and Fang Z Peng, “A Review of Single-Phase Grid-Connected inverters for Photovoltaic Modules” in IEEE Transactions on Industry Applications, vol. 41, no. 5, Sept-Oct 2005, pp. 2327–2332.

[15]. Mostafa Mosa; Haitham Abu-Rub; Jose Rodriguez, "High performance predictive control applied to three phase grid connected Quasi-Z-Source Inverter", in IEEE Industrial Electronics Society, (IECON 2013) pp. 5812–5817, 10-13 Nov. 2013.

[16]. Marek Adamowicz, "LCCT-Z-source inverters", in 10th International Conference on Environment and Electrical Engineering (EEEIC), 2011.

[17]. Mostafa Mosa, Robert S. Balog and Haitham Abu-Rub, "High-Performance Predictive Control of Quasi-Impedance Source Inverter," in IEEE Transactions on Power Electronics, vol. 32, no. 4, pp. 3251-3262, April 2017.

Electrical circuits
Inverters